Robert Mawick (born 9 January 1967) is a retired German football forward.

References

External links
 

1967 births
Living people
German footballers
VfL Bochum players
2. Bundesliga players
Place of birth missing (living people)
Association football forwards